The 1947–48 Minnesota Golden Gophers men's ice hockey team was the 27th season of play for the program but first under the oversight of the NCAA. The Golden Gophers represented the University of Minnesota and were coached by Elwin Romnes in his 1st season.

Season
"Doc" Romnes took over after the retirement of long-time coach, Larry Armstrong and put the team through its paces. Early in the season, Minnesota welcomed in a junior team from Winnipeg as a tune-up for their slate of collegiate opponents. Unfortunately, the Canadiens already had several games under their belt and they used that experience to full effect, dropping the Gophers in back-to-back contests. After the game, Romnes switched up his forward lines in the hopes of producing a better result for the team. Unfortunately, the Gophers lost each of the next three games. They were able to get wins in the two matches against California to salvage their 10-day road trip, but the team was likely already out of the running for an NCAA tournament berth.

When the team returned home they dispatched Harvard in a pair of games to give their fans some hope. The reprieve was short, however, as the Gophers lost the next 5 games and lost any chance they had at being in the postseason. To make matters worse, just prior to the series with North Dakota, the team lost its starting goalie, Jack McEwan, due to academic ineligibility and would have to rely in Ken Austin for the remainder of the year.

The team recovered to go 5–2 in the later portion of the season but that couldn't stop the Gophers from ending the year with a losing record for the first time in a decade.

Roster

Standings

Schedule and results

|-
!colspan=12 style="color:white; background:#862334; " | Regular Season

Scoring statistics

References

Minnesota Golden Gophers men's ice hockey seasons
Minnesota
Minnesota
Minnesota